Digi24, often known as Digi 24, is a 24-hour Romanian news television channel which was launched on 1 March 2012 by Digi TV.

History

10 TV, a generalist television channel, was launched on 10 December 2010 by RCS&RDS. 10 TV hosted Nașul TV show, which Radu Moraru had previously anchored for ten years on B1 TV. 10 TV was subsequently re-launched with a brand new name. On 1 March 2012, 10 TV was rebranded as Digi24 by branding agency Kemistry and hitherto known as such. It has also regional channels like Digi 24 Timișoara, Digi 24 Galați, Digi 24 Constanța, Digi 24 Brașov, Digi 24 Oradea and more.

References

External links
 Official Home Page
 Telecom company RCS & RDS launches Zece TV station with EUR 10 mln investment
 Adevărul, Milionarul din Topul Forbes, orădeanul Zoltan Teszari, lansează mâine un nou post de televiziune
 Mediafax, Televiziunea de ştiri Digi24 a primit licenţă de la CNA şi se va lansa la 1 martie
 Adevărul, Zece TV (10tv) - Prima transmisiune in direct
 Capital, Digi24 a primit undă verde de la CNA 
 Zece TV (10tv) - Prima transmisiune in direct

Television stations in Romania
Television channels and stations established in 2010
24-hour television news channels in Romania
Romanian news websites